Uzeste is a commune in the Gironde department in Nouvelle-Aquitaine in southwestern France. Pope Clement V is buried in the village church.

Population

See also
Communes of the Gironde department

References

Communes of Gironde